Kāinga Ora, officially Kāinga Ora – Homes and Communities, is a Crown agency that provides rental housing for New Zealanders in need. It has Crown entity status under the Kāinga Ora–Homes and Communities Act 2019. 

On 1 October 2019 Kāinga Ora was formed by the merger of Housing New Zealand with its development subsidiary Homes, Land, Community (HLC) and the KiwiBuild Unit from the Ministry of Housing.

History
State housing in New Zealand dates from 1894 with the establishment of the State Advances Office.

In 1905, Prime Minister Richard Seddon introduced the Workers Dwellings Act 1905, introducing public housing to New Zealand. This Act made New Zealand the first nation in the Western world to provide public housing for its citizens. The scheme ultimately failed in 1906 when the workers could no longer afford to pay the high rents asked by the Government for the properties.

The first official state house was opened in 1937 at 12 Fife Lane in Miramar in Wellington.

Housing Corporation of New Zealand was formed in 1974 through a merger of the State Advances Corporation (SAC) and the Housing Division of the Ministry of Works. 

The Housing New Zealand Corporation in its current form is a statutory corporation that was established on 1 July 2001 under the Housing Corporation Act 1974, as amended by the Housing Corporation Amendment Act 2001. This was an amalgamation of Housing New Zealand Limited, Community Housing Limited, and the Ministry of Social Policy. In 2018 the government removed the word Corporation from the name and it was formally known as Housing New Zealand (HNZ).

On 1 October 2019 Housing New Zealand was merged with its development subsidiary HLC, and the KiwiBuild Unit from the Ministry of Housing to form a new Crown entity called Kāinga Ora – Homes and Communities.

Responsibility
Housing New Zealand was the New Zealand Government's principal advisor on housing with its primary role as a provider and manager for housing, specialising in New Zealanders in need of housing assistance.

In 1986, The Residential Tenancies Act was passed and The Ministry of Housing was formed. This entity was responsible for government housing policy, managing the State Housing Appeals Authority, holding and managing Tenancy bond monies, providing tenancy advice (Tenancy Services), delivering mediations and administration of The Tenancy Tribunal. 

In 2004 this role was transferred to the Department of Building and Housing, and then in 2012 it was again transferred to the Ministry of Business, Innovation and Employment. In 2019 the Ministry of Housing held the role.

In April 2014 the Ministry of Social Development took over the assessment of housing needs to determine who was entitled to social housing and their rent subsidy entitlement.

Management

Ministers responsible
The shareholding ministers of all Housing New Zealand subsidiaries are the Minister of Housing and the Minister of Finance.

The Minister of Housing/and Urban Development 
The Hon. Mark Gosche (2001–2003)
The Hon. Steve Maharey (2003–2007)
The Hon. Maryan Street (2007–2008)
The Hon. Phil Heatley (2008–2013)
The Hon. Nick Smith (2013–2014)
The Hon. Paula Bennett (2014–2016)
The Hon. Amy Adams (2016–2017)
The Hon. Phil Twyford (2017–2019)
The Hon. Megan Woods (2019–present)

Associate Minister of Housing and Urban Development/Minister for Building and Construction
The Hon. Jenny Salesa (2017–2019)

Associate Minister of Housing (Social Housing)
The Hon. Kris Faafoi (2019–2020)
The Hon. Poto Williams (2020-2022)

Associate Minister of Housing (Maori)
The Hon. Nanaia Mahuta (2019–2020)
The Hon. Peeni Henare (2020–2023)

Associate Minister of Housing (Homelessness)
The Hon. Marama Davidson (2020–)

The Minister of Finance
The Hon. Michael Cullen (2001–2008)
The Rt. Hon. Bill English (2008–2016)
The Hon. Steven Joyce (2016–2017)
The Hon. Grant Robertson(2017–present)

Board

Chairpersons
Roger Bonifant (2001–2004)
Patrick Snedden (2005–2010)
Alan Jackson (2011–2012)
Allan Freeth (2013–2014)
Adrienne Young-Cooper (2014–2019)
Vui Mark Gosche (2019–present)

Senior management
The Kāinga Ora Leadership Team at 23 July 2021 was as follows.

Chief executives
Michael Lennon (2001–2003)
Helen Fulcher (2003–2006)
Lesley McTurk (2006–2012)
Glen Sowry (2013–2016)
Andrew McKenzie (2016–present)

Controversies

Arena Williams advertisement
In November 2021, Kāinga Ora drew controversy after Newshub and Radio New Zealand reported that the agency had used Labour Party candidate Arena Williams in a taxpayer funded advertisement in 2020, compromising its political neutrality. Kāinga Ora drew criticism from Housing Minister Megan Woods and National Party Nicola Willis on the grounds of professionalism and compromising its political neutrality. Woods subsequently reported the agency to the Public Service Commission. The National Party called for an investigation into Kāinga Ora, alleging a cover up and "culture of deceit."

References

External links
 

Welfare in New Zealand
New Zealand Crown agents
Public housing
Housing in New Zealand
Public Housing in New Zealand